Hindle Wakes is a 1952 British drama film, directed by Arthur Crabtree and starring Lisa Daniely, Brian Worth, Leslie Dwyer and Sandra Dorne. The film was the fourth and last screen adaptation of the famous Stanley Houghton play of the 1910s, dealing with an independent-minded young woman insisting on her right to enjoy a sexual flirtation regardless of the disapproval of family or society.

It was produced and distributed by the independent Monarch Film Corporation. It was made at the Merton Park Studios in London with sets designed by the art director Andrew Mazzei. Location shooting took place in Blackpool and Llandudno.

Plot
Lancashire mill-girls Jenny Hawthorne (Daniely) and Mary Hollins (Sandra Dome) go on holiday to Blackpool during the annual wakes week in their hometown of Hindle.  They run into Alan Jeffcote (Worth), the son of the owner of the mill in which they work, who has also travelled to Blackpool with a group of friends while his fiancée is detained on business in London.  Jenny and Alan hit it off immediately, and he persuades her to leave Blackpool to spend the week with him at Llandudno.  To cover her tracks, Jenny leaves a postcard with Mary, asking her to send it to her parents (Leslie Dwyer and Joan Hickson) later in the week.  She and Alan leave their friends and set off for Wales. They book into a hotel on the Promenade as Mr and Mrs Jeffries.

Shortly afterwards, Mary is involved in a serious boating accident and is killed.  Her possessions are returned to Hindle and the unsent postcard is found in her luggage.  Jenny's parents are already suspicious and concerned by the fact that Jenny has not returned to Hindle as they would have expected in view of such a tragic turn to her holiday, and the discovery of the postcard increases their fears.  Jenny returns at the end of the week.  Her parents ask about her holiday, and allow her to dig a hole for herself as her fictitious account shows she is unaware of Mary's death and has clearly not spent the week in Blackpool.  When confronted with the truth, Jenny admits to where she has been, and with whom, but defiantly refuses to be made to feel guilty or immoral.

The Hawthornes decide that they will have to confront the Jeffcotes (Ronald Adam and Mary Clare) with their son's unacceptable behaviour.  Mrs. Hawthorne's anger is tempered by the fact that she believes the situation may be turned to financial advantage.  Hawthorne feels some trepidation, as he and Jeffcote have been friends since childhood and have remained on good terms despite Jeffcote's rise to social prominence.  To the surprise of the Hawthornes, Jeffcote agrees that in the circumstances Alan must be made to marry Jenny to prevent a scandal.  Mrs. Jeffcote is less convinced, anticipating the ruin of Alan's reputation and business prospects.  A meeting is convened between all the interested parties.  Jenny and Alan remain silent while their parents try to thrash out suitable arrangements, and Mrs. Hawthorne and Mrs. Jeffcote become involved in an undignified shouting match.  Jenny and Alan leave to talk alone.  She tells him that she has no designs on his money and has no interest in marrying him.  She then announces her decision to the incredulous parents, adding that Alan was no more to blame than she was, for both of them it was just a "little fling" about which neither need feel guilty, and that a woman has just as much right as a man to enjoy a brief sexual flirtation with no strings attached.  Alan returns to his fiancée, while Jenny confidently leaves home and her mother's fury for an independent life without interference.

Cast

 Lisa Daniely as Jenny Hawthorne
 Brian Worth as Alan Jeffcote
 Leslie Dwyer as Chris Hawthorne
 Sandra Dorne as Mary Hollins
 Joan Hickson as Mrs. Hawthorne
 Ronald Adam as Mr. Jeffcote
 Mary Clare as Mrs. Jeffcote
 Michael Medwin as George Ackroyd
 Bill Travers as Bob
 Beatrice Varley as Mrs. Hollins
 Tim Turner as Tommy Dykes
 Rita Webb as Mrs. Slaughter
 Lloyd Pearson as Tim Farrer 
 Ben Williams as Jimmy
 Diana Hope as Betty Farrer
 Ian Wilson as 	Mr. Fred Slaughter
 Roy Russell	as Jackson the butler
 Judy Vann as Jeffcote's Secretary
 Cyril Smith as Hotel Porter
 Edward Evans as Chauffeur
 Alastair Hunter as Police Sergeant
 Neil Hallett as Bob's Cousin

Reception

This was the first film version of the play since 1931 and it was felt to be a rather odd choice, as the subject matter which had been considered controversial and provocative a generation earlier now appeared somewhat anachronistic in light of the major changes which had taken place in British society in the interim, particularly the more liberal attitudes growing from the national experience during World War II when previous taboos had been relaxed to a significant degree.  The film was felt to be dated, even by 1952 standards, and the incongruity of supposed Lancashire mill-workers speaking in cut-glass Mayfair tones was also singled out as an absurdity.

The storyline is set in the 1950s and is a valid and accurate reflection of that period. However, it has little resemblance to either the original story or the earlier film versions, having a very different atmosphere. It would have been more widely credited had it not adopted the title "Hindle Wakes" as this does little to validate the film.

External links
 
 Hindle Wakes at BFI Film & TV Database

1952 films
1952 drama films
British drama films
Films directed by Arthur Crabtree
British black-and-white films
British films based on plays
Films set in Wales
Films set in Blackpool
Films shot in Lancashire
Merton Park Studios films
Remakes of British films
1950s English-language films
1950s British films